Documentary Channel (stylized as documentary Channel) is a Canadian English language Category A specialty channel owned by the Canadian Broadcasting Corporation (CBC), the National Film Board of Canada and four other independent producers. Its programming is devoted to featuring primarily documentary films along with documentary-style television series.

History
Licensed as The Canadian Documentary Channel on November 24, 2000 by the Canadian Radio-television and Telecommunications Commission (CRTC); it was launched as the Documentary Channel on September 7, 2001 under the majority ownership of Corus Entertainment through their YTV Canada Inc. subsidiary (53%), CBC (29%), NFB (14%), and the following film producers at 1% each: Omni Film Productions, Cinenova Productions, Barna-Alper Productions, and Galafilm.

On May 11, 2006, Corus Entertainment announced that it would sell its 53% majority stake in the service to the CBC; bringing the CBC's interest to 82% from its former 29%. Corus decided to sell its interest in the service because it stated documentaries were considered a non-core asset and it wanted to further focus its attention on core assets; kids and family, women's lifestyle, and films. On June 22, 2007 the CRTC approved the deal and the transaction was completed.

On March 27, 2008 at 12:01 a.m. EST, the Documentary Channel changed its name to simply, documentary, along with a new logo and on-air graphics.

In October 2013, Neil Tabatznik purchased eOne Television's interest (who gained ownership in the channel when it purchased Barna-Alper Productions in January 2008) in the channel.

In 2016, the CBC rebranded the channel again, slightly modifying the logo to introduce the word "channel", renaming it back to documentary Channel.

Documentary Channel HD
On April 1, 2011 the CBC launched a high definition feed of Documentary Channel, simulcasting the standard definition feed. It is available on Bell Satellite TV, Cogeco, Rogers Cable, EastLink, Bell Fibe TV, Bell MTS, Optik TV, SaskTel, and Shaw Direct.

Logos

See also 
 List of documentary channels
 Documentary Organization of Canada

References

External links 
 

Digital cable television networks in Canada
Canadian Broadcasting Corporation television networks
National Film Board of Canada
Television channels and stations established in 2001
2001 establishments in Canada
Documentary television channels
English-language television stations in Canada
Former Corus Entertainment networks